Tigard High School is a public high school located in Tigard, Oregon, United States. It is one of two high schools in the Tigard-Tualatin School District and educated students in grades 9–12.

History

Tigard High School originally was in a different location from recent times. The school first opened in 1927. It occupied the site of the first Tigard school which occupied a log building from 1853 near downtown Tigard.

The current Tigard High School building opened in 1953.

The school was remodeled in 2004, mostly on the east side of the school.

In November 2016, voters approved Measure 34-248, which provided $291,315,000 for the school district. $62 million of that funding went to build new Tigard High buildings and repair existing ones. A new second-story wing has been added and the commons expanded. After completion, the commons will be the only place to eat lunch. Currently, students who qualify for free or reduced lunch eat in one building and other students in the commons. District spokeswoman Susan Stark Haydon was quoted as saying "expanding that area (commons) will eliminate that equity challenge". The school rebuilt the locker rooms for equality while also adding a new weight room as part of the upgrade. Through construction, the schools' office was moved to the new structure facing Southwest Durham Road. The school also updated security by changing entrances to make them safer.

Academics
Tigard High School has offered the International Baccalaureate curriculum since January 1987.

Demographics
The demographic breakdown of the 1,776 students enrolled in 2019-20 was:
Male - 51.2%
Female - 48.7%
Native American/Alaskan Native - 0.7%
Asian - 6.0%
Black - 2.0%
Hispanic - 23.0%
Native Hawaiian/Pacific Islander - 1.9%
White - 60.2%
Multiracial - 6.0%

29.5% of the students were eligible for free or reduced-cost lunch.

Notable alumni
 Steve Cooke, baseball player
 Katherine Dunn, author
Nick Duron (born 1996), baseball pitcher in the San Francisco Giants organization
 Nico Harrison, former pro basketball player and Current Dallas Mavericks general manager.  
 Mike Kinkade, baseball player
 Lori L. Lake, author
 Kaitlin Olson, actress
 Dan Rayfield, politician
 Craig Rosebraugh, writer

References 

Tigard, Oregon
High schools in Washington County, Oregon
International Baccalaureate schools in Oregon
Public high schools in Oregon